The spotted wood kingfisher or spotted kingfisher (Actenoides lindsayi) is a species of bird in the family Alcedinidae. It is endemic to the Philippines where its natural habitat is subtropical or tropical moist lowland forests.

Description
The spotted wood kingfisher is a colourful bird that can readily be distinguished from other kingfishers in the Philippines. The male has a dark green crown with black spots and a light green stripe above a pale blue supercilium with a black band beneath. A blue moustache is bordered above and below by an orange-brown band and collar. The upper parts are dark green, each feather being tipped with buff giving a spotted effect. The rump is bright green and the tail dark green with brown bars on the outer feathers. The throat is orange-brown and the underparts are mainly white, the breast feathers having green margins. The under-wing coverts are buff. The upper mandible of the bill is black and the lower mandible yellow, the iris is brown and the legs pale green.

The female is similar in appearance but less brightly coloured, the supercilium is green rather than blue, the moustache brownish-green, the hind-neck collar brownish-black and the throat the same colour as the breast. The juvenile resembles the female but has a generally duller colouration.

Distribution and habitat
The spotted wood kingfisher is endemic to the Philippines where it is present on Luzon, Catanduanes, Marinduque, Negros and Panay. It inhabits moist primary forest in both lowland and hilly areas. It was more abundant on Luzon in the past but logging has reduced the area of suitable habitat.

Ecology
The spotted wood kingfisher occurs in pairs or as a solitary bird but is seldom seen because it moves around in dense cover in the lower storey of the forest. It feeds on beetles and other insects, snails and small vertebrates which it probably finds while foraging on the ground. Little is known of its breeding behaviour; it is thought to nest in termite nests in trees, but this may not be the case because other members of the genus mostly choose to nest in holes in trees or in the ground.

Status
This bird has a wide range but its population is suspected to be in slow decline because of the destruction of suitable habitat. The International Union for Conservation of Nature has rated its conservation status as "least concern" because the decline in its numbers is thought to be insufficiently rapid to warrant placing it in a more threatened category.

References

spotted wood kingfisher
Endemic birds of the Philippines
spotted wood kingfisher
Taxonomy articles created by Polbot